Akissi Monney (born 25 August 1979) is an Ivorian judoka. She competed in the women's half-heavyweight event at the 2000 Summer Olympics.

References

External links
 

1979 births
Living people
Ivorian female judoka
Olympic judoka of Ivory Coast
Judoka at the 2000 Summer Olympics
Place of birth missing (living people)